The 109th Indian Infantry Brigade was an infantry brigade formation of the Indian Army during World War II. The brigade was formed in March 1942 in India, and assigned to the 26th Indian Infantry Division. The brigade was transferred to the 14th Indian Infantry Division and designated as a Jungle Training Brigade in August 1943.

Formation 
6th Battalion, 9th Jat Regiment
9th Battalion, 7th Rajput Regiment
16th Battalion, 8th Punjab Regiment
6th Battalion, 2nd Punjab Regiment

See also

 List of Indian Army Brigades in World War II

References 

British Indian Army brigades
Military units and formations in Burma in World War II